The Armed Forces of the North (Forces Armées du Nord or FAN) was a Chadian rebel army active during the Chadian Civil War. Composed of FROLINAT units that remained loyal to Hissène Habré following his break from Goukouni Oueddei and the CCFAN in 1976. Consisting at first of only a few hundred Toubou and some Hajerai and Ouaddaïan fighters, FAN began its operations from bases in eastern Chad, where it received help from Sudan. Driven from N'Djamena back to its eastern refuge after the Libyan incursion of 1980, FAN scored a series of victories over Goukouni's Transitional Government of National Unity (GUNT) forces in 1982, which culminated in the recapture of N'Djamena and Habré's assumption of the presidency. FAN became the core of the new national army, Chadian National Armed Forces (FANT), in January 1983.

Further reading
 Nolutshungu, Sam C. (1996) Limits of Anarchy: Intervention and State Formation in Chad University Press of Virginia, Charlottesville, Virginia, pages 93, 112, 133, 136–137, 160, 167–169, 171, 180, 185–188, and 209.

See also
FROLINAT
Malloum's Military Government
Civil war in Chad (1965–1979)

References

Chadian–Libyan War
Rebel groups in Chad